Fonthip Watcharatrakul, nicknamed Pook Look (born July 19, 1990) is a Thai actress and  beauty pageant titleholder who won Miss Thailand Universe 2010 and represented Thailand in Miss Universe 2010.

Biography
Fonthip was born on July 19, 1990, and raised in Bang Bo, Samut Prakan. Her parents are Watcharapon Watcharatrakul and Daothip Watcharatrakul. She has one sister.

Education
She received her primary education at Ratwinit Bangkaeo in Samut Prakan. She studied humanities at Ramkhamhaeng University.

Pageantry
Fonthip was crowned Miss Thailand Universe 2010 on March 20, 2010. In August 2010, she represented Thailand at Miss Universe 2010,  Las Vegas, winning two special awards: Miss Photogenic and Best National Costume. Although considered a big favorite and a front runner, she failed to place in the Top 15.

Filmography

Television drama 
{| class="wikitable "
! Year
! Title
! Role
! Network
|-
| rowspan = "2" |2010
|Phor Nu Pen Superstar
| Guests
| rowspan = "16"| Channel 7  
|-
|Khunphor Wanwaew 
| Ramida 
|-
| rowspan = "3" |2011
|Tawiphop  
| Prayong
|-
|Ruenlomrak 
| Lomduen
|-
|Plengrak Banna 
| Sriphai
|-
| rowspan = "2"|2012
|Monrak Kaebon 
| Pang-hom / Jing Jok Ra Tree
|-
|Ubattihet 
| Neeranuch
|-
| rowspan = "2"|2013
|Su Phab Bu Rud Baan Tung 
| Keaw
|-
|Ruean Kalong 
| Kalong
|-
| rowspan = "2"|2015
|Puean Pang 
| Pang
|-
|Roy Ruk Rang Kaen 
| Mukrin Kururak (Muk)
|-
|2016
|A Teeta (Former)
|Kalong / Latika (Teena)
|-
|2017
|Nai Hoy Ta Min
| Kham Kaew
|-
| rowspan = "3"|2018
|Mae Ai Sae Eun
| Daonin Poungkam
|-
|Jao Sao Jam Yorm
| May Sarrin Chalampu
|-
|Nang Thip
| Angel Rawipreeya
|-
| rowspan = "1"|2021
|Ley Luang (Leh Lwng)
| Ailada Raksupaphol (Ai)
| rowspan = "2"| One 31
|-
| rowspan = "1"|2022
|Wiwa Fah Laep
| Lalin Wongridpaisal (Lin)
|-
| rowspan = "2"|202
|Patiharn Ruk
| Davika
|PPTV 36
|-
|'| Rinnara 
|One 31
|-
|}

MC Online  2022''' : TurningPoint EP.1 On Air YouTube:Fonthip Watcharatrakul

Awards and nominations

Awards from foreign countries

Other Awards

References

External links
 
 

1990 births
Living people
Fonthip Watcharatrakul
Fonthip Watcharatrakul
Fonthip Watcharatrakul
Fonthip Watcharatrakul
Miss Universe 2010 contestants
Fonthip Watcharatrakul
Fonthip Watcharatrakul
Fonthip Watcharatrakul
Fonthip Watcharatrakul
Fonthip Watcharatrakul
Fonthip Watcharatrakul
Fonthip Watcharatrakul
Fonthip Watcharatrakul